Jessica Abughattas is an American poet. Her debut poetry collection, Strip, was the winner of the Etel Adnan Poetry Prize and was published by University of Arkansas Press.

Abughattas is of Palestinian heritage and was born and raised in California. She has a BFA in Journalism from Pepperdine University, where she was Editor-in-Chief of the student paper. She received her MFA from Antioch University and is a member of RAWI (Radius of Arab American Writers).

Her book was chosen for the Etel Adnan Poetry Prize by Hayan Charara and Fady Joudah, who said of her book: "Strip is a captivating debut about desire and dispossession, and that tireless poetic metaphor, the body. Audacious and clear-eyed, plainspoken and brassy, these are songs that break free from confinement." Victoria Chang said, "Any subject Abughattas writes about becomes a conundrum in the most beautiful of ways, whether the poet is investigating politics, family, identity, or love."

References 

Living people
American women poets
American people of Palestinian descent
Pepperdine University alumni
Antioch University alumni
Year of birth missing (living people)
21st-century American women